Al Ahly SC is an Egyptian sports club based in Cairo, Egypt.

Al-Ahly or Al-Ahli is Arabic for "national". It may also refer to:

Basketball clubs and teams
 Al-Ahli Benghazi (basketball club), Libya
 Al-Ahli Jeddah (basketball), Saudi Arabia
 Al Ahly (basketball), Egypt
 Shabab Al Ahli, Dubai, United Arab Emirates

Football

Libya
 Al-Ahly SC (Benghazi), Libya
 Al Ahli SC (Tripoli), Libya

Sudan
 Al-Ahly Shendi, Sudan
 Al-Ahli Club (Atbara), Sudan
 Al Ahli SC (Khartoum), Sudan
Al Ahli Club (Merowe), Sudan
 Al-Ahli SC (Wad Madani), Sudan

Yemen
 Al-Ahli Club Sana'a, Sana'a, Yemen
 Al-Ahli Taizz SC, Ta'izz, Yemen

Other countries
 Al-Ahli Club (Manama), Bahrain
 Al-Ahli SC (Amman), Jordan
 Al-Ahli SC (Saida), Lebanon
 Al Ahli SC (Doha), Qatar
 Al-Ahli Saudi FC, Jeddah, Saudi Arabia
 Al Ahli Club (Dubai), United Arab Emirates

Other sports
 Al Ahly (handball), Cairo, Egypt
 Al Ahly (table tennis), Cairo, Egypt
 Al Ahly (volleyball), Cairo, Egypt
 Al Ahly (water polo), Cairo, Egypt

Other
 Al Bank Al Ahli Al Omani, an Omani bank that merged with BankMuscat in 1993
 Al Ahly TV, a television channel specialising in the Egyptian football team Alpashm